Ecyrus is a genus of longhorn beetles of the subfamily Lamiinae.

Species
E. albifrons Chemsak & Linsley, 1975
E. arcuatus Gahan, 1892
E. ciliatus Chemsak & Linsley, 1975
E. dasycerus (Say, 1827)
E. hirtipes Gahan, 1895
E. lineicollis Chemsak & Linsley, 1975
E. pacificus Linsley, 1942
E. penicillatus Bates, 1880

References

Pogonocherini